Orléans is a city in Loiret, France. The city has a population of 116,000 and the metropolitan area has a population of nearly 450,000 people.

Urban transport

Bus

Bus services in Orléans are provided by TAO. They serve most areas of the city and outskirts. Services 1, 2, 3, 4, 5, 6, 7, 8, 9, 10, 20, 21 and 26 all serve Orléans station and bus 6 serves Les-Aubrais station.

Tram

Line A opened in 2000 and operates from Les Aubrais in the north to Hôpital de la Source in the south. The tram serves both Orléans railway station and Fleury-Les Aubrais-Orléans. The tram serves the city centre, Olivet and also serves the University of Orléans.

Longer distance transport

Car
Orléans is well connected to the French motorway network. The A10 Motorway (Paris - Bordeaux), the A71 Motorway (Orléans - Clermont-Ferrand) and A19 Motorway (Sens - Artenay). It is also close to National route 20 from Paris to Spain.

Rail

Orléans railway station is a modern station in the city centre. The station is served by trains to Paris, Angers, Blois, Bourges, Nantes, Nevers, Tours and Vierzon.

The station is served by trains to Paris, Blois, Bourges, Brive-la-Gaillarde, Limoges, Nevers, Perpignan, Toulouse, Tours and Vierzon.

Train services are operated by SNCF.

Air

References

External links
Network map of urban services

 
Orléans